Jesús Alonso Escoboza Lugo (born 22 January 1993) is a Mexican professional footballer who plays as a midfielder or defender for Liga MX club Cruz Azul.

Club career

Early career

Escoboza began playing in Tercera Division for Santos Casino where he managed to score eight goals in the 2008–2009 season.  He quickly called (attracted?) the attention of the personnel of Santos Laguna and by the following season he was called to play with a U-17 team where he played from 2009 to 2011. He scored 23 goals in 53 games. Then he participated in both the first team and U-20 team, where he managed to score 14 goals in 30 games.  He was also present in the pre-season of Santos Laguna for the Torneo Apertura 2011, where he scored a goal against Club American in one of the pre-season friendly games.

Santos Laguna

Escoboza made his debut for Santos Laguna on 23 July 2011 at the age of 18, coming on as a substitute in the 81st minute, replacing Oribe Peralta, in a 4–1 win over Pachuca in the Hidalgo stadium. Diego Cocca was the manager who gave Escoboza his league debut.

His first international game was on 27 July against Club Deportivo Olimpia, coming in as a substitute in the 66th minute, replacing Christian Suarez in a 3–1 win. Escoboza scored his first goal on 19 October in a Concacaf Champions League 2011–2012 against Colorado Rapids. However, Escoboza did not play in a single game in the Liga Mx during the Clausura 2012 where Santos Laguna became champions by winning the final against Club Moneterrey.

Club Necaxa

Escoboza was loaned to Necaxa on 20 December 2012. On 4 January 2013, he debuted with Necaxa in a loss to Lobos BUAP.  In the following season, Clausura 2013, he scored two goals against Tiburones Rojo of Veracruz.  Necaxa reached the final, but was defeated by Neza FC who was crowned champion.

Return to Santos Laguna

After finishing his loan to Necaxa, Escobaza returned to Santos Laguna. On 23 August 2013, he scored his first goal in the first division against Club Tijuana. He scored his second goal of the tournament by scoring the second goal in the 59th minute against C.F. Monterrey in a 3–2 win on 18 October 2013.  He scored his first goal in the Liguilla on 24 November 2013 in the first leg quarterfinal game against Querétaro FC in the 70th minute in 3–2 win.

During the Clausura tournament, Escobaza went to play 16 league games, scoring three goals and providing two assists to goal.  He played three games and scored once in Copa MX.

Club Tijuana

On 29 November 2015, Club Tijuana announced that Escoboza would be joining the team for the Clausura 2016. After his first and only season, Escoboza played eight games, totaling 170 minutes, and scoring no goal under manager Miguel Herrera.

Chiapas F.C.

On 9 June 2016, Chiapas announced the signing of Escoboza for the Apertura 2016 in the Liga MX under manager José Cardozo.

Club América

On 29 December 2019, Club América announced that Escoboza would be joining the team for the Clausura 2020 on loan from Xolos.

International career
Escoboza made his senior national team debut on 31 October 2013, coming on as a 60th-minute substitute and scoring in a 4–2 win over Finland. He also played some minutes as a substitute in the two games of the World Cup qualification playoffs against New Zealand, giving an assist in the first leg of the series.

Escoboza was named as one of the seven stand-by players for Mexico's 2014 FIFA World Cup squad.

Career statistics

International

Honours
Santos Laguna
Liga MX: Clausura 2012, Clausura 2015
Copa MX: Apertura 2014
Campeón de Campeones: 2015

Mexico U20
CONCACAF U-20 Championship: 2013

References

External links
 
  
 
 
 

1993 births
Living people
People from Ahome Municipality
Footballers from Sinaloa
Association football midfielders
Mexico youth international footballers
Mexico under-20 international footballers
Mexico international footballers
Santos Laguna footballers
Club Necaxa footballers
Club Tijuana footballers
Chiapas F.C. footballers
Club Puebla players
Dorados de Sinaloa footballers
Querétaro F.C. footballers
Club América footballers
Liga MX players
Ascenso MX players
Mexican footballers